Eastwood, an electoral district of the Legislative Assembly in the Australian state of New South Wales had two incarnations, from 1927 to 1930, and from 1950 to 1999.


Election results

Elections in the 1990s

1995

1991

Elections in the 1980s

1988

1984

1981

Elections in the 1970s

1978

1976

1973

1971

Elections in the 1960s

1968

1965

1962

Elections in the 1950s

1959

1956

1953

1950

1930 - 1950

Elections in the 1920s

1927

References

New South Wales state electoral results by district